BBC Radio Nottingham is the BBC's local radio station serving the county of Nottinghamshire.

It broadcasts on FM, DAB, digital TV and via BBC Sounds from studios on London Road in Nottingham city centre.

According to RAJAR, the station has a weekly audience of 131,000 listeners and a 3.4% share as of December 2022.

Transmission frequencies
Radio Nottingham is broadcast on three FM frequencies:

 103.8 to Nottingham and south Nottinghamshire, from Mapperley Ridge in north Nottingham
 95.5 to Mansfield from Fishponds Hill
 95.1 to Newark from Beacon Hill (since January 2004)

The Mansfield signal is strong enough to be heard as far north as Scunthorpe, far outside Nottinghamshire. The Nottingham signal may be heard as far south as Leicester.

Since 30 April 2004, the station has been available on DAB from the NDEM (NOW Digital East Midlands) Nottingham 12C multiplex from Waltham (main signal and in Leicestershire), Mapperley Ridge and Fishponds Hill (since July 2006).

In addition, BBC Radio Nottingham also broadcasts on Freeview TV channel 720 in both the BBC East Midlands region and the BBC East Yorkshire and Lincolnshire region and streams online via BBC Sounds.

The station used to broadcast AM signals on 1584 kHz Medium Wave, from Clipstone, near Mansfield, until 25 January 2018 when the transmitter was turned off. This followed a trial, to determine if listeners would miss or complain about the loss of services on medium wave, from 17 August to 24 September 2012 when BBC Radio Nottingham stopped broadcasting its normal programmes on medium wave, instead directing listeners to FM or DAB.

North Nottinghamshire, covering the district of Bassetlaw including the towns of Retford and Worksop, is officially covered by the signals carrying BBC Radio Sheffield, although editorially, news for this area is covered by BBC Radio Nottingham, and FM reception (and to a lesser extent DAB and Freeview) is possible in these areas.

Programming
Local programming is produced and broadcast from the BBC's Nottingham studios from 6am – 10pm on Mondays – Thursdays and from 6am – 1am on Fridays – Sundays.

On Monday – Thursday nights, the 10pm – 1am late show, originates from BBC Radio WM. At weekends, the station's evening output is simulcast with BBC Radio Derby and BBC Radio Leicester.

During the station's downtime, BBC Radio Nottingham simulcasts overnight programming from BBC Radio 5 Live and BBC Radio London.

Former notable presenters

Dennis McCarthy, who continued broadcasting on the station – despite falling ill – until the afternoon he died.
Simon Mayo began his radio career here where he worked for four years in 1982, moving to Radio 1 in May 1986
Matthew Bannister, former late night host on Radio 5 Live, worked as a reporter in 1978
Mansfield's Richard Bacon began his broadcasting career at BBC Radio Nottingham
Comedian Boothby Graffoe had a weekly show in the late 1980s for a short time
John Simons worked on the station in the late 1980s. He went on to be the Group Programme Director for GMG Radio

Surrounding areas
The nearest BBC TV news is East Midlands Today, who share the studios on London Road (A60) in Nottingham with the BBC Radio Nottingham team. The studio used to be in a building (York House) near the Victoria Centre on Mansfield Road before 1998. That building was then used by Nottingham Trent University as the Centre for Broadcast Journalism as the base for the Nottingham Trent International College. York House was demolished in May 2015 to make way for proposed future extensions to the Victoria Centre, however a block of student flats were instead built on the former site.

BBC Radio Nottingham faces local competition from the regional commercial stations Gem and Smooth East Midlands, which are broadcast from Nottingham-based studios to the wider East Midlands. Trent FM, Nottingham's heritage commercial radio station, was merged with Leicester Sound and Ram FM in January 2011 to form a regional station Capital East Midlands, which carries a mix of local and networked output. In the Mansfield area commercial station Mansfield 103.2 exists, also transmitted from Fishponds Hill.

Listeners north of Worksop and Retford, are catered for by BBC Radio Sheffield broadcasting on 104.1FM from the Holme Moss transmitter.

References

External links
 BBC Radio Nottingham
 Local news
 The Beat programme on BBC Radio Nottingham
 Behind the scenes of BBC Radio Nottingham's Matchday
  History of local radio in Nottinghamshire

 Reception map
 David's Transmitter World
 Studio webcam
 Clipstone transmitter
 Mansfield (Fishponds Hill) transmitter
 Mapperley Ridge transmitter
 Newark transmitter
 Ciao – The Beat

Audio clips
 First words of Radio Nottingham in January 1968
 Fire eating vicar
 2001 News jingle

Video clips
 Recording the jingles at S2 Blue in Leek

Radio stations established in 1968
Nottingham
Music in Nottinghamshire
Mass media in Nottingham
Radio stations in Nottinghamshire